Hexachlorodisilane is the inorganic compound with the chemical formula Si2Cl6. It is a colourless liquid that fumes in moist air. It has specialty applications in as a reagent and as a volatile precursor to silicon metal.

Structure and synthesis
The molecule adopts a structure like ethane, with a single Si-Si bond length of 233 pm. 

Hexachlorodisilane is produced in the chlorination of silicides such as e.g. calcium silicide.  Idealized syntheses are as follows:
CaSi2 + 4 Cl2 → Si2Cl6 + CaCl2

Reactions and uses
Hexachlorodisilane is stable under air or nitrogen at temperatures of at least up to 400°C for several hours, but decomposes to dodecachloroneopentasilane and silicon tetrachloride in presence of Lewis bases even at room temperature.

4 Si2Cl6 → 3 SiCl4 + Si5Cl12

This conversion is useful in making silicon-based components of use in semiconducting devices including photovoltaic cells.

The compound is also useful reagent for the deoxygenation reactions, such as this general process involving a phosphine oxide:
2 Si2Cl6 + OPR3 → OSi2Cl6 + PR3

References

Chlorosilanes
Chlorides